Neopseudothelphusa is a genus of crabs in the family Pseudothelphusidae, containing the following species:
 Neopseudothelphusa fossor (Rathbun, 1898)
 Neopseudothelphusa simoni (Rathbun, 1905)

References

Pseudothelphusidae